Miss Grand United States 2021 was the fourth edition of the Miss Grand United States pageant, held  at Joe's Live Rosemont, Rosemont Illinois, on June 20, 2021. Eighteen state representatives, either chosen through state pageants or national online casting, competed for the title, of whom the representative from North Carolina, Madison Callaghan, was announced the winner. She later represented the United States at Miss Grand International 2021 in Bangkok, Thailand, but got a non-placement.

Results

Contestants
18 national contestants competed for the title of Miss Grand United States 2021.

Notes

Did not compete
 Arizona - Annaka Jordan
 Iowa - Faith Bernadette
 Michigan - Malia Lopez
 Montana - Shannon MacNeil
 Oregon - Jasmin Arevalo-Larios
 Pennsylvania - Madison Rivera
 Rhode Island - Alexa Cardona
 Virginia - Trerese Roberts
 Washington, D.C. - Faatima Brown

References

External links

Official Website
 

Miss Grand United States
Grand United States 2021
2021 in the United States